Márton Endrédy (11 September 1852 – 4 April 1929) was a Hungarian fencer. He competed in the individual masters sabre, foil and épée events at the 1900 Summer Olympics.

References

External links
 

1852 births
1929 deaths
Hungarian male foil fencers
Hungarian male sabre fencers
Olympic fencers of Hungary
Fencers at the 1900 Summer Olympics
Hungarian male épée fencers
People from Nádudvar
Sportspeople from Hajdú-Bihar County